The following article presents a summary of the 1947 football (soccer) season in Brazil, which was the 46th season of competitive football in the country.

Campeonato Paulista

Final Standings

Palmeiras declared as the Campeonato Paulista champions.

State championship champions

Brazil national team
The following table lists all the games played by the Brazil national football team in official competitions and friendly matches during 1947.

References

 Brazilian competitions at RSSSF
 1947 Brazil national team matches at RSSSF

 
Seasons in Brazilian football